Fuyumi (written , ,  or ) is a feminine Japanese given name. A common meaning is "winter beauty". Notable people with the name include:

, Japanese singer-songwriter
, Japanese novelist
, Japanese singer
, Japanese voice actress
, Japanese manga artist

Fictional characters
, a character in the Classic Literature Club (Hyouka) novel series
, a character in the manga series Food Wars!: Shokugeki no Soma
, a character in the manga series My Hero Academia
, a character in the manga series Blood Lad

Japanese feminine given names